RESIST is an electoral list formed as a result of the coalition between the Marxist–Leninist Workers' Party of Belgium (PTB; Partij van de Arbeit) and the Arab European League (AEL' Arabisch-Europese Liga) for the Belgian federal election, 2003 in the Flemish Region. RESIST was led by PTB lawyer Zohra Othman, herself an ethnic Arab of Moroccan extraction, and received 10,059 votes. Consequently, AEL distanced itself from PTB and formed a new party called the Moslim Democratische Partij.

References

External links
Archived website of the RESIST list
Muslim European group posts anti-Semitic cartoons, European Jewish Press, 6 February 2006
Does the ‘Resist’ electoral List offer unity?, Committee for a Workers' International website, 11 March 2003
RESIST: result evening in Antwerpen, Indymedia Belgium, 18 May 2003

Organizations established in 2003
Political organisations based in Belgium
Political parties of minorities